"The Problem of Our Laws" (German: "Zur Frage der Gesetze") is a short parable by Franz Kafka was published posthumously in Beim Bau der Chinesischen Mauer (Berlin, 1931). The first English translation by Willa and Edwin Muir was published by Martin Secker in London in 1933. It appeared in The Great Wall of China. Stories and Reflections (New York City: Schocken Books, 1946).

Plot

The story is a short narrative, where laws of the land are described as esoteric, created by the elite. Thus, being such they are out of the hands by the common people, yet binding. Nobility is seen as the authority, the creator and executor of laws, yet completely separate from those whom they apply to. Yet, these laws create a sense of security among those who follow them, an empty one, since they are in fact a type of cruel joke. Incidentally, the story echoes the labyrinthine system of law and regulations in place among the official in Kafka's earlier novel, The Castle.
The parable has also been translated by Michael Hofmann in the London Review of Books July 6, 2015.

References

Short stories published posthumously
Short stories by Franz Kafka
Short stories about law